The Dawson-Vanderhorst House, located in Aiken, South Carolina. The house is one of the oldest remaining homes in Aiken County. In 1785, Charles Richmond acquired the property by grant. Shortly thereafter it appears that the home was built. There are a number of architectural features to the home that are representative of the time period in which it was built. The rear extensions to the home are not thought to be part of the original construction. The home is on private property surrounded by tall trees and brush. The Dawson-Vanderhorst House was listed on the National Register of Historic Places on June 29, 1976.

References

Houses on the National Register of Historic Places in South Carolina
Houses in Aiken County, South Carolina
National Register of Historic Places in Aiken County, South Carolina
Buildings and structures in Aiken, South Carolina